The 1998 MTV Movie Awards were hosted by Samuel L. Jackson.

Performers
Natalie Imbruglia — "Torn"
The Wallflowers — "Heroes"
Brandy featuring Ma$e — "Top of the World"

Presenters
Heather Graham and Robert Downey Jr. — presented Best Villain
Anne Heche and Jeff Goldblum — presented Best Female Performance
Denise Richards — introduced Natalie Imbruglia
Jennifer Love Hewitt and Marlon Wayans — presented Best Kiss
Jennifer Lopez and Babyface — presented Best Song from a Movie
Milla Jovovich and Chris Tucker — presented Best Action Sequence
Christina Ricci and Puff Daddy — presented Breakthrough Performance
Martin Landau — presented the Lifetime Achievement Award
Jenna Elfman and Woody Harrelson — presented Best Dance Sequence
Matt Dillon and Cameron Diaz — presented Best On-Screen Duo
Jamie Lee Curtis and Ray Liotta — presented Best Comedic Performance
Joey Lauren Adams and Billy Zane — presented Best Fight
Master P — introduced Brandy featuring Ma$e
Forest Whitaker — presented Best New Filmmaker
Minnie Driver — presented Best Male Performance
Neve Campbell and Courteney Cox-Arquette— presented Best Movie

Awards

Best Movie 
Titanic
Austin Powers: International Man of Mystery
Face/Off
Good Will Hunting
Men in Black

Best Male Performance 
Leonardo DiCaprio – Titanic
Nicolas Cage – Face/Off
Matt Damon – Good Will Hunting
Samuel L. Jackson – Jackie Brown
John Travolta – Face/Off

Best Female Performance 
Neve Campbell – Scream 2
Vivica A. Fox – Soul Food
Helen Hunt – As Good as It Gets
Julia Roberts – My Best Friend's Wedding
Kate Winslet – Titanic

Breakthrough Performance 
Heather Graham – Boogie Nights
Joey Lauren Adams – Chasing Amy
Rupert Everett – My Best Friend's Wedding
Sarah Michelle Gellar – I Know What You Did Last Summer
Jennifer Lopez – Selena

Best On-Screen Duo 
Nicolas Cage and John Travolta – Face/Off
Ben Affleck and Matt Damon – Good Will Hunting
Drew Barrymore and Adam Sandler – The Wedding Singer
Leonardo DiCaprio and Kate Winslet – Titanic
Tommy Lee Jones and Will Smith – Men in Black

Best Villain 
Mike Myers – Austin Powers: International Man of Mystery
Nicolas Cage and John Travolta – Face/Off
Gary Oldman – Air Force One
Al Pacino – The Devil's Advocate
Billy Zane – Titanic

Best Comedic Performance 
Jim Carrey – Liar Liar
Rupert Everett – My Best Friend's Wedding
Mike Myers – Austin Powers: International Man of Mystery
Adam Sandler – The Wedding Singer
Will Smith – Men in Black

Best Song from a Movie 
"Men in Black" by Will Smith — Men in Black
"A Song for Mama" by Boyz II Men — Soul Food
"Deadweight" by Beck — A Life Less Ordinary
"Mouth" by Bush — An American Werewolf in Paris
"My Heart Will Go On" by Céline Dion — Titanic

Best Kiss 
Drew Barrymore and Adam Sandler – The Wedding Singer
Joey Lauren Adams and Carmen Llywelyn – Chasing Amy
Matt Damon and Minnie Driver – Good Will Hunting
Leonardo DiCaprio and Kate Winslet – Titanic
Kevin Kline and Tom Selleck – In & Out

Best Action Sequence 
Speedboat Chase – Face/Off
 T-Rex Attacks San Diego – The Lost World: Jurassic Park
 Bug Attacks Fortress – Starship Troopers
 Ship Sinks – Titanic
 Motorcycle/Helicopter Chase – Tomorrow Never Dies

Best Dance Sequence 
Mike Myers — "Soul Bossa Nova" (from Austin Powers: International Man of Mystery)
Mark Addy, Paul Barber, Robert Carlyle, Steve Huison, Hugo Speer and Tom Wilkinson — "You Can Leave Your Hat On" (from The Full Monty)
Alan Cumming, Lisa Kudrow and Mira Sorvino — "Time After Time" (from Romy and Michele's High School Reunion)
Cameron Diaz and Ewan McGregor — "Beyond the Sea" (from A Life Less Ordinary)
Mark Wahlberg — "Machine Gun" (from Boogie Nights)

Best Fight  
Will Smith vs. Cockroach – Men in Black
Harrison Ford vs. Gary Oldman – Air Force One
Milla Jovovich vs. Aliens – The Fifth Element
Demi Moore vs. Viggo Mortensen – G.I. Jane
Michelle Yeoh vs. Bad Guys – Tomorrow Never Dies

Best New Filmmaker
Peter Cattaneo – The Full Monty

Lifetime Achievement Award
Clint Howard

References

External links
MTV Movie Awards: 1998  at the Internet Movie Database

 1998
Mtv Movie Awards
MTV Movie Awards
1998 in Los Angeles
1998 in American cinema